Itonama is a moribund or extinct language isolate once spoken by the Itonama people in the Amazonian lowlands of north-eastern Bolivia. It was spoken on the Itonomas River and Lake in Beni Department.

Language contact
Jolkesky (2016) notes that there are lexical similarities with the Nambikwaran languages due to contact.

An automated computational analysis (ASJP 4) by Müller et al. (2013) found lexical similarities between Itonama and Movima, likely due to contact.

Phonology

Vowels

Diphthongs: .

Consonants

The postalveolar affricates  have alveolar allophones . Variation occurs between speakers, and even within the speech of a single person.

The semivowel  is realized as a bilabial fricative  when preceded and followed by identical vowels.

Morphology 
Itonama is a polysynthetic, head-marking, verb-initial language with an accusative alignment system along with an inverse subsystem in independent clauses, and straightforward accusative alignment in dependent clauses.

Nominal morphology lacks case declension and adpositions and so is simpler than verbal morphology (which has body-part and location incorporation, directionals, evidentials, verbal classifiers, among others).

Vocabulary
Loukotka (1968) lists the following basic vocabulary items for Itonama.

{| class="wikitable sortable"
! gloss !! Itonama
|-
| one || chash-káni
|-
| two || chash-chupa
|-
| tooth || huomóte
|-
| tongue || páchosníla
|-
| hand || mapára
|-
| woman || ubíka
|-
| water || huanúhue
|-
| fire || ubári
|-
| moon || chakakáshka
|-
| maize || udáme
|-
| jaguar || ótgu
|-
| house || úku
|}

See also
Llanos de Moxos (archaeology)
Macro-Paesan languages

Further reading
Camp, E. L.; Liccardi, M. R. (1967). Itonama, castellano e inglés. (Vocabularios Bolivianos, 6.) Riberalta: Summer Institute of Linguistics.

References

External links
Sample of Itonama fragment
 Lenguas de Bolivia (online edition)
 Itonama (Intercontinental Dictionary Series)

Critically endangered languages
Language isolates of South America
Macro-Paesan languages
Languages of Bolivia
Mamoré–Guaporé linguistic area